43 kilometr is a rural locality (a settlement) in Oborskoye Rural Settlement of Imeni Lazo District, Russia. The population was 214 as of 2012. There are 2 streets.

Geography 
The settlement is located on the right tributary of the Obor River, 59 km northeast of Pereyaslavka (the district's administrative centre) by road. Obor is the nearest rural locality.

Streets 
 Zelyonaya

References 

Rural localities in Khabarovsk Krai